Nasuhi Yağız Kaba (born 7 August 1989) is a Turkish professional basketball player. He currently plays for Beşiktaş Cola Turka.

References

External links
TBLStat.net Profile

1989 births
Living people
Turkish men's basketball players
Beşiktaş men's basketball players
Guards (basketball)